The men's 1500 m at the 2009 KNSB Dutch Single Distance Championships in Heerenveen took place at Thialf on 2 November 2008.  24 athletes participated in the contest.. Simon Kuipers was the title holder.

Result 

Source:

References 

Single Distance Championships
2009 Single Distance